Aneta Benko (née Peraica; born 29 July 1985) is a retired Croatian handball player who was last played for RK Podravka Koprivnica and for the Croatian national team.

References

1985 births
Living people
Croatian female handball players
Handball players from Zagreb
RK Podravka Koprivnica players
Mediterranean Games competitors for Croatia
Competitors at the 2009 Mediterranean Games
21st-century Croatian women